Minuscule 398 (in the Gregory-Aland numbering), α 398 (Soden), is a Greek minuscule manuscript of the New Testament, on parchment. Paleographically it has been assigned to the 10th century.
Formerly it was designated by 9a and 11p.

Description 

The codex contains the text of the Acts of the Apostles, General epistles, and Pauline epistles on 251 parchment leaves with lacunae (Acts 3:6-17; 1 Timothy 4:12-2 Timothy 4:3; Hebrews 7:20-11:10; 11:23-13:25). It is written in one column per page, in 22 lines per page.

Text 

The Greek text of the codex is a representative of the Byzantine text-type with exception for the General epistles. Aland placed it in Category V (except General epistles). The text of General epistles Aland assigned to the Category III.

Aland gave for it the following textual profile: Acts 751 281/2 42 1s, Cath 621 71/2 162 13s, Paul 1581 481/2 32 0S.

 1: agreements with the Byzantine text
 1/2: agreements with the Byzantine text where it has the same reading as the original text
 2: agreements with the original text
 S: independent or distinctive readings ("Sonderlesarten").

History 

Gregory dated it to the 11th or 12th century. Currently it is dated by the INTF to the 10th century.

The manuscript once belonged to François Vatable, friend of Robert Estienne and professor of Hebrew in Paris. The manuscript probably was used in Editio Regia as ιγ'.
It was slightly examined by Scholz, who catalogued it twice (as 9a and 112a). Fenton Hort examined Catholic epistles. C. R. Gregory saw it in 1886. In 1908 Gregory gave for it number 398.

In the 18th century it was used as an argument against the authenticity of the Comma Johanneum.

Formerly it was designated by 9a and 11p. In 1908 Gregory gave the number 398 to it.

The manuscript is currently housed at the Cambridge University Library (Kk. 6.4) in Cambridge.

Former 398 
Formerly number 398 (Scholz) belonged to a commentary housed in the Turin National University Library (C. II. 5). It contains 310 leaves (31.1 by 21.8 cm), written in 2 columns and 30 lines per page, dated to the 13th century. Gregory saw it in 1886. In 1908 Gregory removed it from the list of the New Testament manuscripts because it is rather a commentary, with incomplete text of the Gospels. It was examined and described by Giuseppe Passini (as 109).

See also 

 List of New Testament minuscules
 Biblical manuscript
 Textual criticism

References

Further reading 

 

Greek New Testament minuscules
10th-century biblical manuscripts